Troublesome Valley [elevation: ] is a valley in Pendleton County, West Virginia, in the United States.

Troublesome Valley has been noted for its unusual place name.

References

Landforms of Pendleton County, West Virginia
Valleys of West Virginia